John Fellows may refer to:
John R. Fellows, American lawyer and politician
John Fellows (cricketer), English cricketer
John Fellows (brigadier general), see Order of battle of the Battle of Long Island
John Fellows (Continental Army officer), see Landing at Kip's Bay
John Fellows (horse trainer) in Canadian International Stakes
Sir John Fellows, 1st Baronet (c. 1671–1724), of the Fellows baronets

See also
John Fellows Akers, businessman
John Fellowes (disambiguation)
Fellows (disambiguation)